The Philippine National Open Athletics Championships is an annual outdoor track and field competition, organized by the Philippine Athletics Track and Field Association.

Editions

Was originally set to be held at the PhilSports Stadium in Pasig in December 4-6 2020, but was postponed due to the COVID-19 pandemic.

See also
List of Filipino records in athletics

References

Athletics competitions in the Philippines

National athletics competitions